Warsaw is an unincorporated community and census-designated place (CDP) in Warsaw Township, Rice County, Minnesota, United States.  As of the 2010 census, its population was 627.

The community is located east of Morristown and west of Faribault.

Warsaw is located at the junction of State Highway 60 (MN 60) and Rice County Road 13 (Farwell Avenue) on the west side of Cannon Lake.

The community is located within ZIP code 55087.

Demographics

References

 Official State of Minnesota Highway Map – 2013/2014 edition

Census-designated places in Minnesota
Census-designated places in Rice County, Minnesota